Andrea Zambelli (April 24, 1927 – October 22, 1994) was an Italian bobsledder who competed in the mid-1950s. He won a gold medal in the two-man event at the 1954 FIBT World Championships in Cortina d'Ampezzo.

References
Bobsleigh two-man world championship medalists since 1931

1927 births
1994 deaths
Italian male bobsledders